Gregor Sikošek (born 13 February 1994) is a Slovenian football defender who plays for Maribor.

International career
In November 2016, Sikošek received his first call-up to the senior Slovenia squad for the matches against Malta and Poland. He made his debut against the latter on 14 November 2016.

Career statistics

Club

International

References

External links
 NZS profile 
 

1994 births
Living people
People from Brežice
Slovenian footballers
Slovenia international footballers
Association football fullbacks
NK Krško players
FC Koper players
Brøndby IF players
Silkeborg IF players
NK Domžale players
NK Maribor players
Slovenian Second League players
Slovenian PrvaLiga players
Danish Superliga players
Slovenian expatriate footballers
Expatriate men's footballers in Denmark
Slovenian expatriate sportspeople in Denmark